Finnerud Forest Scientific Area is a  forest in Oneida County, Wisconsin. The site is one a small amount of large areas in the states surrounding the Great Lakes that feature red pine trees of 100 years of age. It is owned by the University of Wisconsin–Madison. The forest was designated a Wisconsin State Natural Area in 1958 and a National Natural Landmark in 1973.

References

Protected areas of Oneida County, Wisconsin
National Natural Landmarks in Wisconsin
Forests of Wisconsin
University of Wisconsin–Madison